Zohreh Mojabi (born 14 February 1960 in Qazvin) is an Iranian actress and playwright who has appeared in a number of films and TV serials.

Mojabi studied at the School of Fine Arts, University of Tehran from which she received a BA in acting and an MA from Azad University.

Mojabi's radio plays are often broadcast on IRIB.

Filmography 
 Naghash-e Javan (1992)
 Marde-Avazi (1998)
 Boodan ya naboodan (1999)
 Mard-e Barani (2000)
 Azizam Man Kook Nistam (2002)
 Eshgh-e Film (2003)
 Acacia Alley (2003 - 2004)
 Majnoone Leyli (2008)
 Farari (2009)
 3 Daraje Tab (2009)
 kolah geess (2010)

References

External links 

Living people
1960 births
People from Qazvin
People from Tehran
Iranian film actresses
University of Tehran alumni
Iranian television actresses
Iranian dramatists and playwrights
Islamic Azad University, Central Tehran Branch alumni